The Justifier is a light gun peripheral released by Konami for numerous home console games. Konami released versions of the gun for the Mega Drive/Genesis, Super NES, and PlayStation consoles. The original gun was similar in appearance to a Colt Python. The guns were originally designed for use with the home versions of Konami's Lethal Enforcers games, although they are compatible with other titles as well.

Models
The Genesis and Super NES versions of the Justifier light gun were modeled after the revolver-shaped light gun controllers used in the original Lethal Enforcers arcade cabinet. The blue Justifier gun connects directly to the console. Optionally, a pink Justifier can be daisy chained into the blue gun for use by a second player. The pink Justifier was only available directly from Konami via mail-order and is compatible with both the Super NES and Genesis models of the blue gun through a 6-pin RJ-11 phone cord. Konami opted to design its own light gun for the console versions of Lethal Enforcers, instead of using the first-party Super Scope and Menacer light guns, in order to provide a more accurate experience of the arcade game at home.

The PlayStation version of the lightgun (Sony ID: SLEH-00005, SLUH-00017), sold as the Hyper Blaster in Japan and Europe, is colored green (with the Japanese model being black) and only works in the first controller slot on the original design of the PlayStation 2. The Hyper Blaster was also the first light gun for the PlayStation, preceding the release of Namco's GunCon by a few years. Project Horned Owl, a gun-shooting game published by Sony Computer Entertainment, was the first title to support it. The Hyper Blaster and the GunCon were mutually incompatible, although some games, such as Elemental Gearbolt, supported both peripherals.

Compatible games

Sega CD
 Lethal Enforcers
 Lethal Enforcers II: Gun Fighters
 Snatcher
 Crime Patrol
 Mad Dog McCree
 Mad Dog II: The Lost Gold
 Who Shot Johnny Rock?

Genesis/Mega Drive
 Lethal Enforcers
 Lethal Enforcers II: Gun Fighters

Super NES
 Lethal Enforcers

PlayStation
 Area 51
 Crypt Killer
 Die Hard Trilogy
 Die Hard Trilogy 2: Viva Las Vegas
 Elemental Gearbolt
 Lethal Enforcers I & II
 Maximum Force
 Mighty Hits Special
 Project Horned Owl
 Silent Hill (Used to unlock hidden weapon)

PlayStation 2
 The Keisatsukan: Shinjuku Ni Juu Yon Ji [JP]
 Police 24/7 [EU]

References

Light guns
Konami